The Raiffeisen Bank is the largest bank in Albania, with more than 60% of all retail deposits and the largest branch network.

Background
It was originally known as Banka e Kursimeve (Savings Bank of Albania), but following its acquisition by Raiffeisen Zentralbank (RZB) during 2004 it was rebranded as Raiffeisen Bank. Since the acquisition, Raiffeisen has implemented retail lending and services, starting with ATM services and debit cards, and later additional retail activities. The bank is also building its corporate and SME businesses.

References

2004 establishments in Albania
Banks of Albania
Raiffeisen Zentralbank
Banks established in 2004